When God Was a Rabbit is a book by Sarah Winman that was first published in 2011.  It won Winman various awards including New Writer of the Year in the Galaxy National Book Awards and was one of the books chosen by Richard & Judy in their 2011 Summer Book Club.

Synopsis 
When God Was a Rabbit follows the life of a young girl – Eleanor Maud (Elly for short) – as she grows up first in Essex, then Cornwall and the various characters she meets and befriends along the way.  The book is named after God, a pet rabbit given to Elly by her brother who is a constant companion during her childhood.  Overall it is a story about love in all its forms, surrounding the central characters, Elly, her brother and their extended circle of family and friends.

Awards 
 New Writer of the Year in the Galaxy National Book Awards (United Kingdom), 2011
 Newton First Book Award in the Edinburgh International Book Festival (United Kingdom), 2011
 Waterstones 11 (United Kingdom), 2011
 The Exclusive Books Boeke Prize (South Africa), 2011

Reviews 
 Claudia FitzHerbert: Triumph and disaster, The Spectator, 19 March 2011
 Anthony Cummins: Fiction in Brief, The Telegraph, 28 March 2011
 Richard Madeley and Judy Finnigan: Review: When God Was a Rabbit, Summer 2011
 David Hebblethwaite: Book Review Sarah Winman, The Huffington Post, 14 December 2011

References

Edition
 Sarah Winman: When God Was a Rabbit (Headline Review: London, 2011).

2011 British novels
English novels
Novels set in Essex
Novels set in Cornwall
Novels set in New York City
2011 debut novels
Headline Publishing Group books